Spilosoma erythrophleps is a moth in the family Erebidae. It was described by George Hampson in 1894. It is found in Assam, India.

Description
Head, thorax, and abdomen reddish orange; palpi and frons black; collar and tegulae with paired black spots; abdomen with dorsal black bands and patch on terminal segment. Forewing orange, the veins scarlet; numerous black spots in the interspaces; a black streak from base through the cell to near outer margin. Hindwing pale ochreous; medial and postmedial maculate black bands conjoined into a large patch in cell; a marginal series of spots with one inside it on vein 5.

Wingspan 52 mm.

References

Spilosoma erythrophleps at BOLD
Spilosoma erythrophleps at BHL
Spilosoma erythrophleps at Markku Savela's Lepidoptera and Some Other Life Forms

Moths described in 1894
erythrophleps